Olof Tobias Sebastian Thyberg (born 12 September 1975) is a Swedish diplomat who is Sweden's Ambassador to Ukraine from September 2019.

Biography 
Tobias Thyberg was born in Stockholm.

He holds an M.Sc. in political science from the Uppsala University and an M.Sc. in international economics from the Stockholm School of Economics. He speaks English, Russian, French, Spanish and German.

Tobias Thyberg is a career diplomat who served as Ambassador of Sweden to Afghanistan until August 2019. His previous diplomatic postings include Swedish missions in New Delhi, Moscow, Washington, D.C., as well as the Swedish Representation to the European Union in Brussels and the Delegation of the European Union to Georgia.

Since the autumn of 2019, Thyberg has served as the Swedish Ambassador to Kyiv, Ukraine.

References

External links 
 Sweden's Ambassador to Afghanistan under fire for glorifying Babur 
 Sweden is interested in further expansion of cooperation 

1975 births
Living people
People from Stockholm
Uppsala University alumni
Stockholm School of Economics alumni
Ambassadors of Sweden to Ukraine